Return on tangible equity (ROTE) (also return on average tangible common shareholders' equity (ROTCE)) measures the rate of return on the tangible common equity. 

ROTE is computed by dividing net earnings (or annualized net earnings for annualized ROTE) applicable to common shareholders by average monthly tangible common shareholders' equity. Tangible common shareholders' equity equals total shareholders' equity less preferred stock, goodwill, and identifiable intangible assets.

References

Financial ratios
Management cybernetics